Ivan Delić (Cyrillic: Иван Дeлић; born 15 February 1986) is a Montenegrin footballer who most recently played for FK Budućnost Podgorica.

International career
Delić made his senior debut for Montenegro in a November 2008 friendly match against Macedonia and has earned a total of 2 caps, scoring no goals. His second and final international was another friendly against the same opposition in March 2010.

References

External links
 
 HLSZ 

1986 births
Living people
Footballers from Podgorica
Association football midfielders
Serbia and Montenegro footballers
Montenegrin footballers
Montenegro under-21 international footballers
Montenegro international footballers
OFK Titograd players
FK Budućnost Podgorica players
FK Mladá Boleslav players
Zalaegerszegi TE players
KF Vllaznia Shkodër players
OFK Grbalj players
KF Tirana players
FK Lovćen players
FK Mogren players
FK Mladost Velika Obarska players
FK Borac Banja Luka players
Second League of Serbia and Montenegro players
First League of Serbia and Montenegro players
Montenegrin First League players
Nemzeti Bajnokság I players
Kategoria Superiore players
First League of the Federation of Bosnia and Herzegovina players
Premier League of Bosnia and Herzegovina players
Montenegrin expatriate footballers
Expatriate footballers in the Czech Republic
Montenegrin expatriate sportspeople in the Czech Republic
Expatriate footballers in Hungary
Montenegrin expatriate sportspeople in Hungary
Expatriate footballers in Albania
Montenegrin expatriate sportspeople in Albania
Expatriate footballers in Bosnia and Herzegovina
Montenegrin expatriate sportspeople in Bosnia and Herzegovina
First League of the Republika Srpska players